Siswala is a village in the Hisar district of Haryana, India. It is 19 km west of Hisar, near the Rajasthan border.

Demographics
The population of the village is approximately 3,442. The main occupation of most peoples is agriculture, and a few people are employed in the Indovax Company, which is 2 km outside the village. This company has given employment to hundreds of people from the Siswala village and nearby villages Kirtan, Rawalwas and Kharia.

Government
The village has a local administration called panchayat. The head of the panchayat is known as the sarpanch.

Culture
The village has people from all the communities but the majority include Jat(42%) and Kumhar(22%). The village has two Hindu temples and one Gurudwara.

Resources and infrastructure
The agricultural land in the village is irrigated by a canal, or rajbaha, known as Balsamand Minor and by a few tube wells. The village has two ponds for drinking water for cattle: Pili Johari and Johar. Drinking water is supplied from a water supply system situated outside the village operated by the state government. Power is available from a substation built in 2007.

Transportation
Siswala is accessible by road transport from the nearest city, Hisar. A few bus services operate regularly during the day, including Haryana Roadways and Ganga Jamuna.

References

External links
Article.wn.com
Google.co.uk
Hisar.nic.in

Villages in Hisar district